Benjamin David Salisbury (born October 19, 1980) is an American actor and dancer best known for playing the role of Brighton Sheffield on the CBS television sitcom The Nanny from 1993 to 1999.

Born in Minneapolis, Minnesota, on October 19, 1980, to parents David Arthur Salisbury and Mindy Jo (née Schneidewind) Salisbury. In 1998, he graduated from Wayzata High School in Plymouth, Minnesota, and enrolled in American University in Washington, D.C., that fall.

An accomplished dancer, Salisbury would often treat The Nanny studio audiences to improvisational routines when the cameras were not rolling.

Salisbury also played Martin Short's son in the 1992 film Captain Ron, and appeared in D3: The Mighty Ducks (1996) as the sports announcer.

Benjamin played the voice of Tin Boy on The Oz Kids in 1996.

Salisbury was a contestant on Jeopardy! where he competed in a very special Teen Celebrity Jeopardy! against Kirsten Dunst and Joseph Gordon-Levitt. Salisbury won with $1 but received $15,000 for his charity, while Dunst and Levitt each received $10,000 for theirs.

He appeared in the 2004 reunion of the sitcom The Nanny titled The Nanny Reunion: A Nosh to Remember with Fran Drescher, Renée Taylor, Rachel Chagall and others from The Nanny cast.

In 2005, he had a minor role as a train expert on the episode "Sabotage" of the series Numb3rs. In August 2006, Salisbury was featured in Domino's Pizza commercials featuring Fudge-ums, Domino's then-new mini-brownies.

As of February 2017, Salisbury is working at Universal Studios Hollywood as the Director of Operations for the park.

Salisbury has been married to his wife Kelly Murkey since 2006. Salisbury has 3 children. Daughter born in 2008, and 2 sons born in 2013 and 2016.

References

External links

1980 births
Living people
American University alumni
American male child actors
Male actors from Minneapolis
American male television actors
American male film actors
20th-century American male actors
21st-century American male actors